The women's 50 metre backstroke event at the 2002 Commonwealth Games took place 2–3 August. The heats and the semi were held on 2 August, the final on 3 August.

Results

Final

Key: WR = World record

Semifinals

Preliminaries

References
Heats Results

Swimming at the 2002 Commonwealth Games
2002 in women's swimming